Patrice Franceschi (born December 18, 1954 in Toulon) is a French adventurer.

Franceschi is also a writer, a documentary & film maker, a sailor and a pilot. He has been awarded several medals and distinctions. Patrice Franceschi was also at the origins of many humanitarian missions in war zones (Bosnia-Herzegovina, Kurdistan, Somalia, Afghanistan, etc.). He is former Chairman of the Société des Explorateurs Français, and former Chairman and co-founder of Solidarités International.

Franceschi is the captain of the 3-masted schooner La Boudeuse, aiming at scientific expeditions related to social evolutions and climate change matters. He is most famous for being the first man to carry a solo around-the-world flight in an Aviasud Sirocco ultralight aeroplane from September 26, 1984 to March 26, 1987.  Following this tour of 2½ years (562 hours of flight, across 33 countries), he wrote a book recounting his expedition: La folle équipée.

He also took part in many expeditions, including the project The Spirit of Bougainville, whose first ship La Boudeuse (a Chinese junk, thirty meters long), sank 130 miles east of Malta.

He is the author of numerous books and has directed several films from his expeditions.

Awards and honours
2015 Prix Goncourt de la Nouvelle for Première personne du singulier

References

External links 
Société des Explorateurs Français

French explorers
Circumnavigators of the globe
20th-century French non-fiction writers
21st-century French non-fiction writers
French male short story writers
French short story writers
French documentary film directors
Winners of the Prix Broquette-Gonin (literature)
Prix Goncourt de la nouvelle recipients
People from Toulon
1954 births
Living people
20th-century French male writers